State Route 180 (SR 180) is a  state highway in the northeastern part of the U.S. state of Georgia. Its routing is located within portions of Union and Towns counties.

Route description

SR 180 begins at an intersection with SR 60 in Suches, within the Chattahoochee-Oconee National Forest and Union County. It winds its way to the northeast until it intersects US 19/US 129/SR 11 (Gainesville Highway), just northeast of Vogel State Park. The route heads east to SR 348 (Richard B. Russell Scenic Highway). SR 180 continues to the northeast, until it meets its eastern terminus, an intersection with SR 17/SR 75 (Unicoi Turnpike) halfway between Hiawassee and Helen in southern Towns County.

SR 180 traverses some of the most difficult terrain in Georgia, traveling the gaps of the highest mountains in the state. The route has two sections known as Bald Mountain Road and Wolfpen Gap Road, which are joined by the concurrency with US 19/US 129/SR 11. Most of the highway is in the Chattahoochee National Forest.

Bald Mountain Road, named for the state's highest peak (Brasstown Bald), is the eastern section of the highway and has been designated a National Scenic Byway and a Georgia Scenic Byway. Part of SR 180 is included in the Russell–Brasstown Scenic Byway. Bald Mountain Road crosses the Nottely River shortly before the concurrency with US 19/US 129/SR 11.

Wolfpen Gap Road (the  western section of the highway) is known to be the curviest road in the state. Sites along this section include various hiking trails and scenery as well as Vogel State Park, access to Sosebee Cove, an intersection with the Coosa Back Country Trail, and Lake Winfield Scott (Georgia's highest lake).

SR 180 is not part of the National Highway System, a system of roadways important to the nation's economy, defense, and mobility.

Major intersections

Bannered route

State Route 180 Spur (SR 180 Spur) is a  spur route that connects the SR 180 mainline with a parking lot at the visitors center for Brasstown Bald, the highest point in Georgia. It starts on the Towns–Union county line, then travels completely within Towns County.

SR 180 Spur shares the National Scenic Byway and Georgia Scenic Byway designations bestowed upon the SR 180 mainline. Because of the altitude and steepness of the road, and because it serves no through traffic, it is often closed in winter due to inclement weather.

See also

References

External links

 Georgia Roads (Routes 161 - 180)
 Brasstown Bald Pictures: Several images of SR 180 Spur

180
Transportation in Union County, Georgia
Transportation in Towns County, Georgia